Korucak can refer to:

 Korucak, Bayramiç
 Korucak, Çamlıyayla